His Imperial and Most Faithful Majesty was a manner of address of the Brazilian Empire 1825–1826.

References

Royal styles
Style of the Brazilian sovereign
Brazilian monarchy